The 2018 Uttarakhand Municipal general elections were held in the Indian state of Uttarakhand on 18 November 2018.

The Uttarakhand State Election Commission announced the poll dates on 15 October 2018. The results were declared on 20 November 2018.

The elections for the Roorkee Municipal Corporation, municipal councils of Bajpur and Srinagar and the nagar panchayats of Bhatrojkhan and Selakui were postponed.

Elections are not held in the nagar panchayats of Badrinath, Kedarnath and Gangotri due to their status of temporary settlements. Local interim administration councils administer these three pilgrimage sites for a period of six months during the summers.

Results

Municipal Corporation Mayoral results

Municipal Council Chairpersons results

Nagar Panchayat Chairpersons results

Municipal general election results

See also
2018 Dehradun Municipal Corporation election
2018 elections in India

References

 Nagar Nigam Election 2018
 Nagar Nigam Election 2018

External links
 Official Website

Local elections in Uttarakhand
2018 elections in India